Race Pro is a sim racing video game developed by SimBin Studios (later Sector3 Studios) and published by Atari exclusively for Xbox 360. The game uses the new Lizard game engine whereas the PC SimBin games used the Gmotor engine. This marks the first console game completed and released by SimBin.

The game uses the ISI (RFactor) game engine under license. It features cars and drivers from the 2007, 2006 and the original 1987 FIA World Touring Car Championship seasons, as well as the European F3000, Formula BMW, Mini Challenge and Caterham cup. The game also has three GT categories, on top of this it has racing Radicals and road cars which are the Audi R8, Koenigsegg CCX, Koenigsegg CCXR and Dodge Viper.

The drivers in the game are mostly real people, such as Tiff Needell, Tor Graves, and all the Touring car drivers of the 2007 FIA WTCC championship.

Tracks
Tracks available in the game are those that were used in the 2007 WTCC and only the configuration used that year is available to drive for each circuit. They can all be raced in offline and online and in wet and dry conditions with up to sixteen entrants.

Autódromo Internacional de Curitiba, Circuit de Pau, Macau's Guia Circuit and Porto Circuit had not been playable before on seventh-generation consoles though it is possible to drive around Macau and sections of the Guia Circuit in Project Gotham Racing 4.

The other tracks are Circuit de Valencia, Brno Circuit, Brands Hatch, Motorsport Arena Oschersleben, Autodromo Nazionale Monza, Anderstorp Raceway, Circuit Park Zandvoort, Mazda Raceway Laguna Seca, Road America, and added through DLC packs, Imola Circuit, Circuito do Estoril, Okayama International Circuit, and Circuit de Spa-Francorchamps.

Reception
Race Pro has received mixed ratings, with an average Metacritic score of 72%. The main criticisms were the grainy textures and large amounts of tearing, sparsely constructed tracks, and lack of in-game music. The game has an issue whereby it can sometimes lose players' saved career progress when going online. Wet weather is cosmetic only, so grip levels do not change.

References

External links
Race Pro at IGN
Race Pro Review at IT Reviews
Foro de la Comunidad Hispanoparlante del Race Pro en Xbox360

2009 video games
Atari games
Auto GP
Racing simulators
SimBin Studios games
Video games developed in Sweden
Video games set in Brazil
Video games set in China
Video games set in the Czech Republic
Video games set in France
Video games set in Germany
Video games set in Italy
Video games set in the Netherlands
Video games set in Portugal
Video games set in Spain
Video games set in Sweden
Video games set in the United Kingdom
Video games set in the United States
World Touring Car Championship
Xbox 360-only games
Xbox 360 games